is a Japanese politician of the Liberal Democratic Party, a member of the House of Representatives in the Diet (national legislature). A native of Nishinomiya, Hyogo and graduate the University of Tokyo he joined the Ministry of Transport in 1977. He was elected to the House of Representatives for the first time in 2005.

References

External links 
  in Japanese.

1953 births
Living people
People from Nishinomiya
University of Tokyo alumni
Koizumi Children
Members of the House of Representatives (Japan)
Liberal Democratic Party (Japan) politicians